The Ciężki karabin maszynowy wz. 25 Hotchkiss (Polish for "Heavy machine gun, Mark 1925, Hotchkiss") was a Polish derivative of the Hotchkiss M1914 machine gun, rechambered for 7.92×57mm Mauser ammunition.

Design
The modification was designed in late 1924 and speedily pressed into service with the Polish Army. However, as initially the barrels remained unchanged, the resulting weapon suffered from overheating and poor accuracy and the wz. 25 was withdrawn from infantry service and relegated to Border Defence Corps and artillery units. Some weapons were further modified in the 1930s and used as the main machine gun in Polish armoured cars. Feeding was provided by a standard 30-round metal feed strip.

Some Polish wz. 25 guns were captured by the Wehrmacht during the German and Soviet invasion of Poland of 1939 and pressed into German service as 7,9 mm sMG 238(p).

Hotchkiss et Cie
Machine guns of Poland
World War II machine guns
Medium machine guns